The 1983–84 Sussex County Football League season was the 59th in the history of Sussex County Football League a football competition in England. It also was the first season for the league to consist of three divisions.

Division One

Division One featured 14 clubs which competed in the division last season, along with two new clubs, promoted from Division Two:
Horsham YMCA
Lancing

League table

Division Two

Division Two featured 13 clubs which competed in the division last season, along with three new clubs:
Arundel, relegated from Division One
Chichester City, relegated from Division One
Lingfield, transferred from the Combined Counties League

League table

Division Three

League table

References

1983-84
1983–84 in English football leagues